Stuart Thomas McMillan (17 September 1896 – 27 September 1963) was an English football player and manager, and a cricketer. As a footballer, he played as a winger in the Football League for clubs including Derby County, Gillingham, Wolverhampton Wanderers and Bradford City. He later managed Derby between 1946 and 1953, winning the FA Cup in 1946. As a cricketer, he was a right-handed batsman and a right-arm medium-fast bowler who played for Derbyshire.

Early life
Stuart McMillan was born in Leicester on 17 September 1896. His father Johnny McMillan was a Scottish professional footballer and football manager, then playing for Leicester Fosse after recently being transferred from Derby County.

Football career
He later returned to Derby County as manager between 1946 and 1953, taking them to the 1946 FA Cup Final. Derby defeated Charlton Athletic 4–1 after extra time to win the FA Cup for the first time.

Cricket career
McMillan also played first-class cricket for Derbyshire. His debut came in the 1922 season against Essex at Derby, where, as a middle order batsman, he was unable to make much headway in the match, bowling a single, expensive over, conceding 14 runs, and finishing not out for 0 in the only innings in which he batted. As there was no play on the first day of the match, it was to end in a draw with the best batting performance of the game coming from Essex's centurion Peter Perrin.

McMillan made just one appearance during the following season, and had to wait for more than thirteen months before making his final two appearances, both at home, in 1924. While he scored well in the first match of the season, his second finished with him getting out for a duck.

Death
McMillan died in Ashbourne, Derbyshire, on 27 September 1963, aged 67.

See also
List of English cricket and football players

References

External links
Stuart McMillan at Cricket Archive

1896 births
1963 deaths
Footballers from Leicester
English cricketers
Derbyshire cricketers
English footballers
English football managers
Derby County F.C. players
Gillingham F.C. players
Wolverhampton Wanderers F.C. players
Bradford City A.F.C. players
Nottingham Forest F.C. players
Leyton Orient F.C. players
English Football League players
Derby County F.C. managers
English Football League managers
Chelsea F.C. players
Association football wingers